Natale a Beverly Hills is a 2009 Italian comedy film directed by Neri Parenti.

Cast

See also
 List of Christmas films

References

External links

2009 films
Films directed by Neri Parenti
Films scored by Bruno Zambrini
Films set in Los Angeles
2000s Italian-language films
2009 comedy films
2000s Christmas comedy films
Italian Christmas comedy films
2000s Italian films
Foreign films set in the United States